Netzwerk is an East German film. It was released in 1970.

External links
 

East German films
Films whose director won the Heinrich Greif Prize
1970s German-language films
1970s German films